Claude Ivan Taylor  (May 20, 1925 – April 23, 2015) was a Canadian transportation executive. He was the President and CEO of Air Canada.

Born in Salisbury, New Brunswick, he graduated as a Registered Industrial Accountant from McGill University in 1953. He started at Air Canada in 1949 as a reservation agent and would become president and CEO from 1976 to 1984. From 1984 to 1992, he was chairman of the board. He was president and CEO again from 1990 to 1992. He was president of the International Air Transport Association from 1979 to 1980.

In 2006, he was made an Officer of the Order of Canada for having "turned Air Canada into a world leader in air transportation and, through his leadership of professional organizations at home and abroad". In 1985, he was inducted into Canada's Aviation Hall of Fame. He has received honorary degrees from the University of New Brunswick and McMaster University. He was also a Commander of the Order of St. John.

References

1925 births
2015 deaths
Air Canada people
Commanders of the Order of St John
McGill University Faculty of Management alumni
Officers of the Order of Canada
People from Westmorland County, New Brunswick
Canadian chief executives